Robert Savin was a member of the Virginia House of Burgesses, the elected lower house of the colonial Virginia General Assembly, from "Warrosquoyacke County," later Isle of Wight County, in the assemblies of 1629 and 1629–1630.

The area represented by Savin originally was known as Lawne's Plantation. The colonists also had named the area "Warresqueak County" or "Warrosquoyack County" after the Native American tribe who lived there. Stanard shows the spelling of the county for which Savin was a member as "Warrosquoyacke County."

Stanard shows four members from Warrosquoyacke County in the assemblies of 1629, convening October 16, 1629, and of 1629–1630, convening March 24, 1630 but only one member from "Warrosqueake" County in the assembly of 1631–1632.

In 1620, a movement began to change the name of "Warresqueak County" to "Isle of Wight County" but this was not done until 1637.

Notes

References

 Henings, Statutes at Large, shown as Virginia, William Waller Hening, Virginia (Colony). The statutes at large: being a collection of all the laws of Virginia. Volume 1, Richmond, VA: Printed by and for Samuel Pleasants, Junior, printer to the Commonwealth, 1809–1823. . Retrieved July 15, 2011.
 Long, Charles M. Virginia County Names: Two Hundred and Seventy Years of Virginia History. New York and Washington: The Neale Publishing Company, 1908. . Retrieved February 9, 2014.
 Stanard, William G. and Mary Newton Stanard. The Virginia Colonial Register. Albany, NY: Joel Munsell's Sons Publishers, 1902. , Retrieved July 15, 2011.
 Tyler, Lyon Gardiner, ed. 'Encyclopedia of Virginia Biography'. Volume 1. New York, Lewis Historical Publishing Company, 1915. . Retrieved February 16, 2013.

People from Isle of Wight County, Virginia
Virginia colonial people
House of Burgesses members
Year of birth missing
Year of death missing